The color champagne is a name given for various very pale tints of yellowish-orange that are close to beige.  The color's name is derived from the typical color of the beverage Champagne.



Champagne

The color champagne is displayed at right.  

The first recorded use of champagne as a color name in English was in 1915.

Variations of champagne

Medium champagne

At right is displayed the color medium champagne.

The medium tone of "champagne" displayed at right is the color called champagne in the Dictionary of Color Names (1955) in color sample #89.

Deep champagne

The deep tone of "champagne" displayed at right is the color called champagne in the Dictionary of Color Names (1955) in color sample #73.

Dark champagne

At right is displayed the color dark champagne.

The dark tone of "champagne" displayed at right is the color called champagne in the ISCC-NBS Dictionary of Color Names (1955) in color sample #90.

Champagne in human culture
Animal husbandry
 Champagne is a horse color used to describe some horses (see champagne gene).

Astronomy
 SN 2003fg was an aberrant type Ia supernova discovered in 2003 and described in the journal Nature on September 21 2006. It was nicknamed the Champagne Supernova after the 1996 song "Champagne Supernova" by the English rock band Oasis.
Merchandise
 Champagne is most often used to describe gemstones or paint finishes (such as for an automobile) in order to imply that one is purchasing a luxury product.

See also
 List of colors

References

Shades of orange